Richard Davidson (born 1951) is a professor of psychology and psychiatry.

Richard Davi(d)son may also refer to:

Richard K. Davidson (born 1942), American railway executive
Richard M. Davidson, Old Testament scholar and Seventh-day Adventist
Richard M. Davidson (actor), Canadian-American actor
Richard Davidson, a character in A Soldier's Play
Richard Davison, racing driver in 1984 Australian Grand Prix
Richard Davidson, speedway rider in New Zealand Solo Championship
Richard Davisson (1922–2004), American physicist
Richard Davison (1796–1869), MP for Belfast
Richard Davison (equestrian) (born 1955), dressage rider